The Orpheus Monument is a Roman monument in Ptuj, Slovenia, an almost  high and about  wide stele, carved of white Pohorje marble. It is located at Slovene Square, the town's central square, in front of the Town Tower. It is the oldest public monument preserved in its original location in Slovenia, the largest discovered monument from the Roman province of the Pannonia Superior, and the symbol of Ptuj.

The monolith was originally a grave marker, erected in the 2nd century AD to honor the memory of Marcus Valerius Verus, the duumvir (mayor) of Roman Poetovio. In the Middle Ages, it was used as a pillory. Criminals were tied to the iron rings attached to its lower part. Since March 2008, it has the status of a national cultural monument.

The central relief illustrates scenes from the myth of Orpheus, who plays the lyre while mourning his lost love Eurydice. Other reliefs depict the Greek-Egyptian god Serapis, who symbolizes the hope of resurrection. The corners each contain a prone lion gnawing on a ram's head. Beneath this, a relief in the tympanum depicts the Moon goddess Selene, leaning over her dead lover Endymion. All the reliefs and inscriptions are badly eroded.

References

External links

2nd-century Roman sculptures
Monuments and memorials in Slovenia
Ptuj
Cultural monuments of Slovenia
Orpheus
Pannonia Superior
Roman sites in Slovenia
Sculptures of classical mythology
Serapis
Steles